The San Blas Islands of Panama is an archipelago comprising approximately 365 islands and cays, of which 49 are inhabited. They lie off the north coast of the Isthmus of Panama, east of the Panama Canal. A part of the comarca (district) Guna Yala along the Caribbean coast of Panama is home to the Kuna people.

San Blas and its surrounding area is a haven for ecotourism because of its pristine environs. The area is also popular for sailing, as it is known for its beauty and lack of hurricanes. Notable locations in the Archipelago are the main capital El Porvenir, the densely crowded island village of Carti Sugtupu, and the two keys, Cayos Limones, and Cayos Holandeses, both renowned for their clear waters.

The islands could be rendered uninhabitable by sea level rise in the late 21st century.

Tradition and legacy 

Before the arrival of Europeans, the Guna wore few clothes and decorated their bodies with colorful designs. When encouraged to wear clothes by the missionaries, they copied these designs in their molas, which they wore as clothing.

The Guna worship a god named Erragon, who they believe came and died just for the Guna people. Driven off Panama during the Spanish invasion, the Guna fled to the surrounding 378 islands. Today their chief lives on an island called Acuadup, which means "rock island". Many Guna are hunters and fishermen. Many families live close to the mainland in villages and the families will rotate their time living on the islands. On some of the islands, children can attend school. Most of the men now speak Spanish, although the women carry on older traditions.

From 1679 to 1681, William Dampier started and ended his first journey with privateers and pirates in these islands which he called "The Samballoes," a rendezvous-place for pirates, convenient for hiding and privacy.

Climate
The San Blas Islands have a tropical monsoon climate. Temperatures are hot all year round. There is a lengthy wet season from May to January and a short dry season in the rest of the year.

See also 
Provinces of Panama
Guna Yala
San Blas Rebellion

Further reading 
 Lecumberry, Michel. San Blas: Molas and Kuna traditions. (2nd ed., rev) [Panama]: Txango Publications, 2006.
 Humphreys, Sara and Calvo, Raffa. The Rough Guide to Panama. London: Rough Guides, 2010.
 Baker, Christopher P. and Mingasson, Gilles. National Geographic Traveler: Panama. (2nd ed.) Washington, DC: National Geographic, 2011.
 Banse, Timothy P.  Basic Kuna: Dictionary, Words & Phrases. Middle Coast Publishing, 2015.

References

External links 
 
 Frommer's Travel Guide: Comarca Kuna Yala
 San Blas, videos and photos
 Dictionary, Words & Phrases
 Ancient (1852) Spanish/Kuna Dictionary

Caribbean islands of Panama